Fowlkes is a surname. Notable people with the surname include:

Alan Fowlkes (born 1958), retired professional baseball player
Charles Fowlkes (1916–1980), American baritone saxophonist
Curtis Fowlkes, American jazz trombonist
David Fowlkes, Jr. (born 1970 in Milwaukee, Wisconsin), the inventor of the Spinner
Eddie Fowlkes (born 1962), techno DJ from Detroit, Michigan
Herman Fowlkes, Jr. (1919–1993), American jazz musician and educator from Chicago, Illinois
Lauren Fowlkes (born 1988), American soccer player from Lee's Summit, Missouri
Tremaine Fowlkes (born 1976), American professional basketball player